= Gazoza =

Carbonated beverage

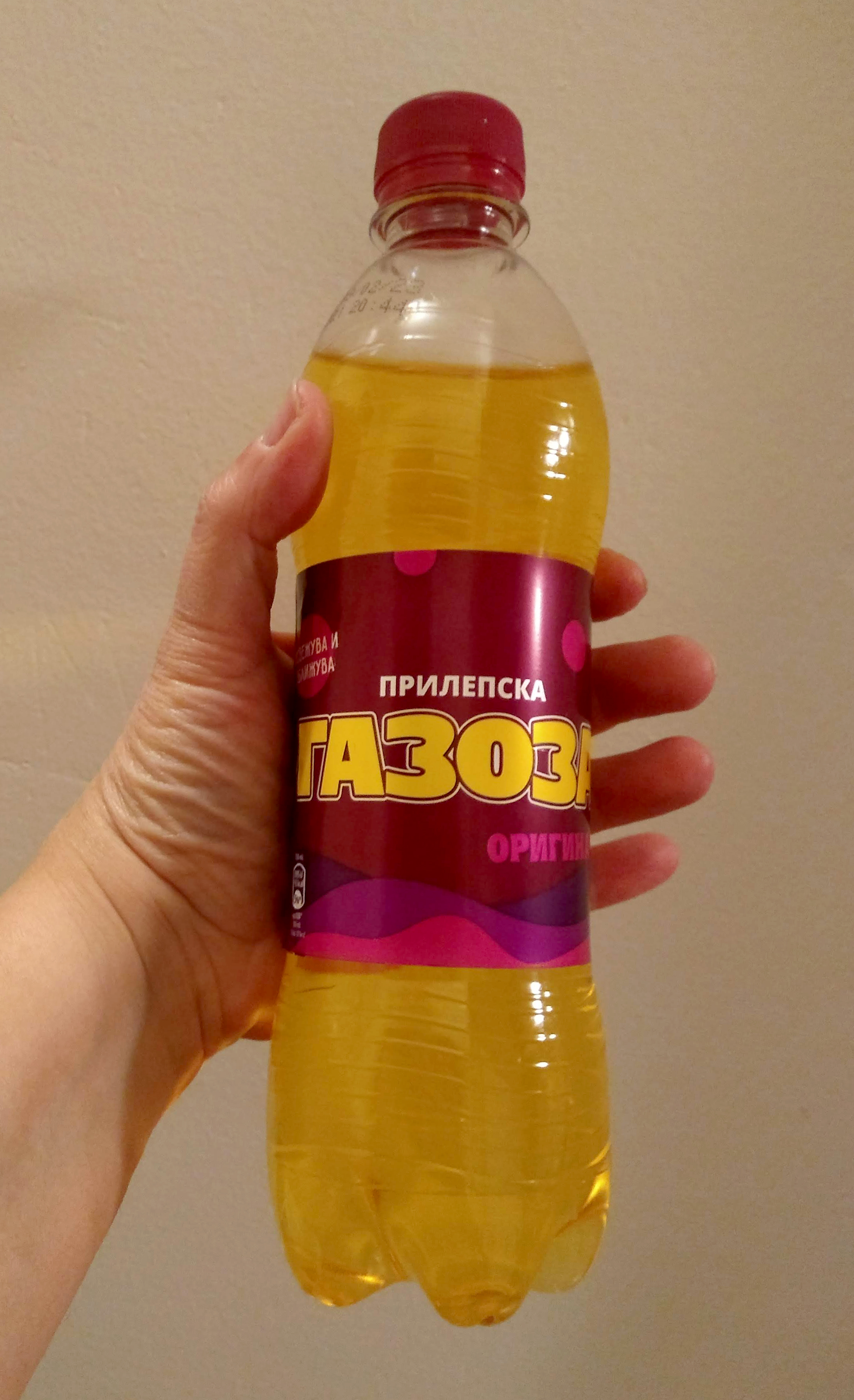
- Type: Soft Drink
- Manufacturer: Prilep Brewery
- Country of origin: North Macedonia

Prilepska Gazoza (Macedonian: Прилепска Газоза) is a carbonated beverage with pear aroma and flavor. Although drinks with a similar or the same name are made in other countries, pear flavored Gazoza is an original product of North Macedonia, whose inhabitants it is popular among.

Gazoza is exported to the surrounding Balkan countries, Austria, Switzerland, Sweden, Australia and the United States. Gazoza is produced by Prilep Brewery.

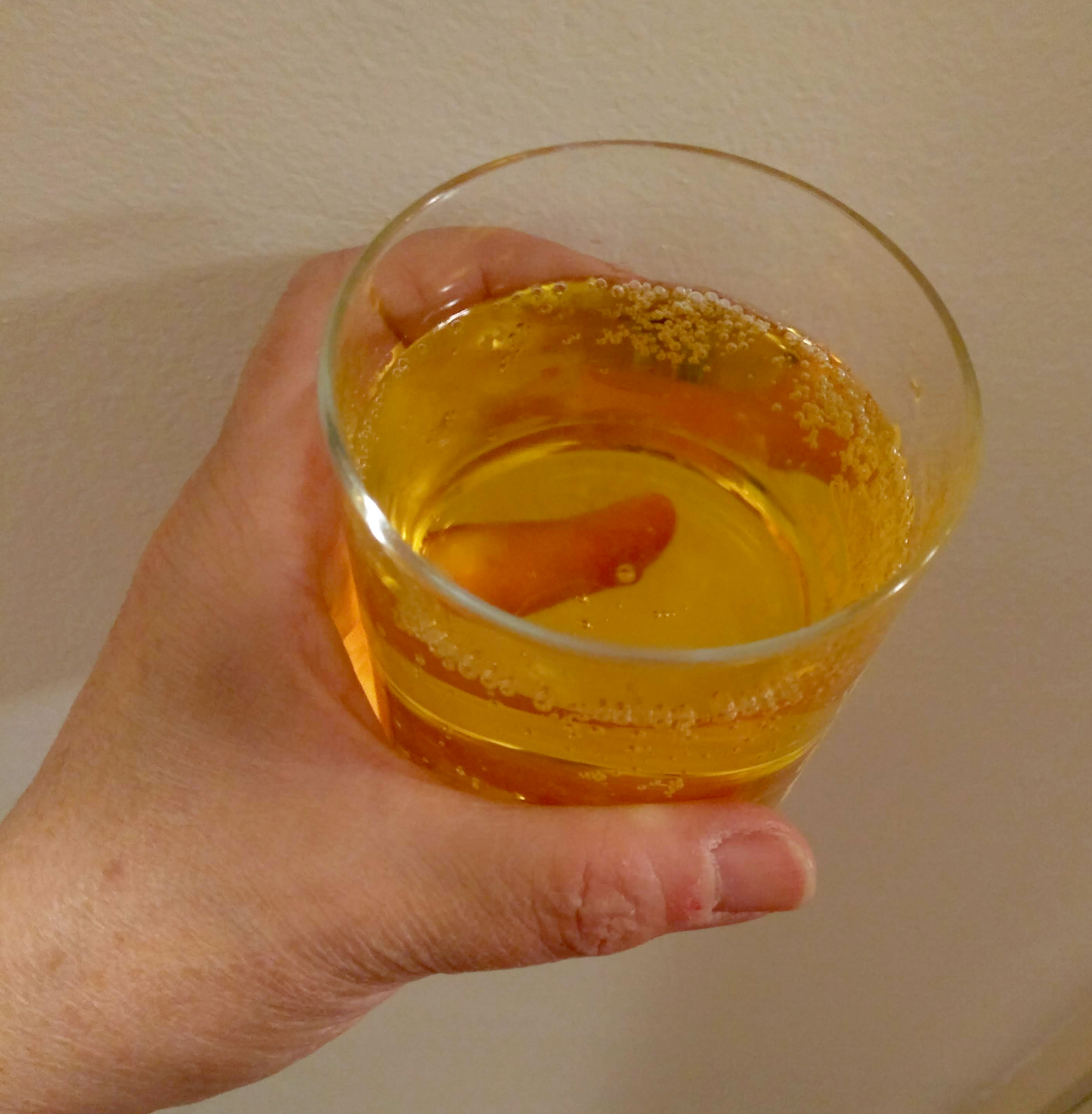
A cup of Gazoza
